Pierre H. Cadieux  (born April 6, 1948) is a lawyer and former Canadian politician.

Born in Hudson, Quebec, Cadieux was first elected to the House of Commons of Canada as the Progressive Conservative Member of Parliament for Vaudreuil, Quebec in the 1984 federal election that brought Brian Mulroney to power.

In 1986, he was appointed to the Canadian Cabinet as minister of Labour, and in 1989, was moved in a cabinet shuffle to minister of Indian Affairs and Northern Development. In that position, future Prime Minister Kim Campbell served under him as minister of state. In 1990, he was shuffled again to the position of Solicitor-General of Canada, and in 1991, he became Deputy Government House Leader and minister of State for Fitness and Amateur Sport and for Youth.

Cadieux left Cabinet when Mulroney retired as prime minister, and did not run in the 1993 federal election.

External links 
 

1948 births
Living people
Members of the House of Commons of Canada from Quebec
Members of the King's Privy Council for Canada
Progressive Conservative Party of Canada MPs
Solicitors General of Canada
Members of the 24th Canadian Ministry